Criminal Confessions is an American true crime television series that premiered October 1, 2017, and airs on  Oxygen. Each episode features a different criminal case and showcases footage from inside actual police interrogation rooms and dissects what it takes to yield a confession. Police officers and detectives walk viewers through their strategy, as interviews with the suspects' and victims' friends and family shed light on the details of the case.

Episodes

Season 1 (2017)

Season 2 (2018)

Season 3 (2019-20)

External links
  on Wolf Entertainment

References

2017 American television series debuts
Oxygen (TV channel) original programming
English-language television shows
2020s American crime television series
True crime television series